A total of 47 teams contested the division, which was divided into three league tables west, center and east, including 41 sides remaining in the division from the previous season, three relegated from the Algerian Championnat National 2, and three promoted from the Regional League I (4th Division).

Groupe Est

References

Inter-Régions Division seasons
3